Washington County is a county in the U.S. state of Minnesota. As of the 2020 census, the population was 267,568, making it the fifth-most populous county in Minnesota. Its county seat is Stillwater. The largest city in the county is Woodbury, the eighth-largest city in Minnesota and the fourth-largest Twin Cities suburb.

Washington County is included in the Minneapolis-St. Paul-Bloomington, MN-WI Metropolitan Statistical Area.

History
Early development in the area was on the St. Croix River, which now forms the boundary with Wisconsin on the county's eastern side. The river provided a waterway to move settlers upstream and to transport logs downstream. The heavily forested area fostered an early logging and lumber economy. The area's first settlers arrived at the future Afton in 1837. In 1838 settlers started Dacotah, at the north edge of present Stillwater, at the junction of Brown's Creek and the St. Croix. The creek's name is from the founder of this settlement, Joseph Renshaw Brown. However, a sawmill was  built at Marine-on-St.-Croix in 1839, and another was built in the current location of downtown Stillwater in 1844. The success of these soon attracted the settlers from Dacotah, and that community declined.

This area was part of Wisconsin Territory until the eastern part of that territory achieved statehood in 1848. Brown and other leaders called a meeting (the "Stillwater Convention") on August 26, 1848. The convention drafted a Memorial to Congress that a new territory be created with the name “Minnesota,” and elected Henry Hastings Sibley to deliver this citizens' petition to the U.S. Congress. Because of this convention, Stillwater calls itself the “Birthplace of Minnesota.” Congress responded by creating Minnesota Territory effective March 3, 1849.

The newly established territorial legislature created nine counties across the territory in October 1849. Washington County was one of the nine, named for George Washington, with Stillwater named as county seat. The county's first sheriff was appointed in 1849, and the county's school district began in 1850.

After the forests were depleted, the economy of Washington County became primarily agricultural. With the growth of neighboring Ramsey County and St. Paul, some of Washington County developed based on tourism and recreation, as with Mahtomedi and Landfall. Late in the 20th century, the population greatly increased with the suburban expansion of St. Paul.

Geography

Washington County lies on the east side of Minnesota. Its east border abuts the west border of the state of Wisconsin (across the St. Croix River). The Mississippi River flows south-southeastward west of Washington County, and forms the southwest border of the county as it flows toward its confluence with the St. Croix (at the county's southernmost point). Washington County terrain consists of low rolling hills, sloping to the south and east, with its highest point on the lower west border at 1,053' (321m) ASL. It is the fourth-smallest county in Minnesota by land area and fifth-smallest by total area.

Major highways

  Interstate 35
  Interstate 94
  Interstate 494
  Interstate 694
   US Highway 8
  US Highway 10
  US Highway 12
  US Highway 61
  Minnesota State Highway 36
  Minnesota State Highway 95
  Minnesota State Highway 96
  Minnesota State Highway 97
  Minnesota State Highway 120
  Minnesota State Highway 244
 List of county roads

Airports
 Forest Lake Airport (25D) - south of Forest Lake
 Lake Elmo Airport (21D) - northeast of Lake Elmo

Adjacent counties

 Chisago County - north
 Polk County, Wisconsin - northeast
 St. Croix County, Wisconsin - east
 Pierce County, Wisconsin - southeast
 Dakota County - southwest
 Ramsey County - west
 Anoka County - northwest

Protected areas

 Afton State Park
 Big Marine Park Reserve
 Cottage Grove Ravine Regional Park
 Falls Creek Scientific and Natural Area
 Gateway State Trail
 Grey Cloud Dunes Scientific and Natural Area
 Hardwood Creek Wildlife Management Area
 Katherine Abbott Park
 Lake Elmo Park Reserve
 Lost Valley Scientific and Natural Area
 Mississippi National River and Recreation Area (part)
 Pine Point Regional Park
 Point Douglas Park
 Rutstrum State Wildlife Management Area
 Saint Croix Bluffs Regional Park
 Saint Croix National Scenic Riverway (part)
 Saint Croix Savanna Scientific and Natural Area
 Square Lake County Park
 Sunfish Lake Park
 William O'Brien State Park

Demographics

2020 census

Note: the US Census treats Hispanic/Latino as an ethnic category. This table excludes Latinos from the racial categories and assigns them to a separate category. Hispanics/Latinos can be of any race.

2010 census
The ethnic makeup of the country, according to the 2010 Census, was the following:
 87.77% White
 3.60% Black
 0.49% Native American
 5.07% Asian
 >0.01% Native Hawaiian or Pacific Islander
 2.10% Two or more races
 0.97% Other races
 3.41% Hispanic or Latino (of any race)

As of the census of 2010, there were 238,136 people, 87,446 households, and 64,299 families in the county. The population density was 620/sqmi (239/km2). There were 87,446 housing units at an average density of 228/sqmi (87.9/km2). 39.4% were of German, 14.4% Irish, 13.0% Norwegian, and 9.9% Swedish ancestry. There were 87,446 households, out of which 38.6% had children under the age of 18 living with them, 60.6% were married couples living together, 9.5% had a female householder with no husband present, and 26.5% were non-families. 21.5% of all households were made up of individuals, and 7.3% had someone living alone who was 65 years of age or older. The average household size was 2.67 and the average family size was 3.14.

The county population contained 23.5% under the age of 18, 6.2% from 18 to 24, 32.90% from 25 to 44, 28.7% from 45 to 64, and 10.3% who were 65 years of age or older. The median age was 38 years. For every 100 females there were 98.02 males. For every 100 females age 18 and over, there were 97.03 males. The median income for a household in the county was $79,735, and the median income for a family was $92,497. The per capita income for the county was $36,786. About 5.2% of the population was below the poverty line.

According to the 2007-2011 American Community Survey, of the county's population 25 years and over, 1.4% had less than 9th grade education, 2.8% held 9th to 12th grade with no diploma, 23.6% had High school graduate or equivalent, 22.2% held Some college with no degree, 27.0% had bachelor's degree, and 13.0% earned Graduate or professional degree.

2000
As of the 2000 United States Census, there were 201,130 people, 71,462 households, and 54,668 families in the county. The population density was 524/sqmi (202/km2). There were 73,635 housing units at an average density of 192/sqmi (74.0/km2). The racial makeup of the county was 93.63% White, 1.83% Black or African American, 0.39% Native American, 2.14% Asian, 0.03% Pacific Islander, 0.60% from other races, and 1.37% from two or more races.

There were 71,462 households, out of which 41.60% had children under the age of 18 living with them, 64.80% were married couples living together, 8.50% had a female householder with no husband present, and 23.50% were non-families. 18.70% of all households were made up of individuals, and 5.40% had someone living alone who was 65 years of age or older. The average household size was 2.77 and the average family size was 3.19.

The county population contained 29.40% under the age of 18, 6.80% from 18 to 24, 32.90% from 25 to 44, 23.20% from 45 to 64, and 7.60% who were 65 years of age or older. The median age was 35 years. For every 100 females there were 98.80 males. For every 100 females age 18 and over, there were 96.80 males.

The median income for a household in the county was $66,305, and the median income for a family was $74,576 (these figures had risen to $78,067 and $90,867 respectively as of a 2007 estimate). Males had a median income of $49,815 versus $33,804 for females. The per capita income for the county was $28,148. About 2.00% of families and 2.90% of the population were below the poverty line, including 3.50% of those under age 18 and 4.10% of those age 65 or over.

Politics and government

Washington County voters slightly tend to vote Democratic. In 63% of national elections since 1948, the county selected the Democratic Party candidate (as of 2020).

Like all counties in Minnesota, Washington is governed by an elected and nonpartisan board of commissioners.  Each commissioner represents a district of approximately equal population.

Washington County is divided among three congressional districts. Northern Washington County is represented by Minnesota's 6th congressional district (CPVI R+12), central Washington County by Minnesota's 4th congressional district (CPVI D+14), and southern Washington County by Minnesota's 2nd congressional district (CPVI EVEN).

Economy

Largest employers
According to the County's 2021 Annual Comprehensive Financial Report, the top employers in the county are:

Points of interest
 Afton State Park
 Afton Alps Ski Area
 Gateway State Trail
 William O'Brien State Park

Communities

Cities

 Afton
 Bayport
 Birchwood Village
 Cottage Grove
 Dellwood
 Forest Lake
 Grant
 Hastings (part)
 Hugo
 Lake Elmo
 Lake St. Croix Beach
 Lakeland
 Lakeland Shores
 Landfall
 Mahtomedi
 Marine on St. Croix
 Newport
 Oak Park Heights
 Oakdale
 Pine Springs
 Saint Marys Point
 Saint Paul Park
 Scandia
 Stillwater (county seat)
 White Bear Lake (partly in Ramsey County)
 Willernie
 Woodbury

Unincorporated communities

 Arcola
 Basswood Grove
 Carnelian Junction
 Maple Island
 Siegel

Ghost towns
 Garen
 Point Douglas

Townships

 Baytown
 Denmark
 Grey Cloud Island
 May
 Stillwater
 West Lakeland

Superfund sites and environmental damage
Washington County has had three locations listed as Environmental Protection Agency Superfund sites due to soil and groundwater contamination. The Baytown Township Ground Water Plume and the Oakdale Dump are currently listed, while the Washington County Landfill was cleaned up and removed from the Superfund list in 1996.

See also
National Register of Historic Places listings in Washington County, Minnesota
List of Superfund sites in Minnesota

References

External links
 Washington County official government’s website
 Washington County Parks
 Washington County Sheriff's Office
 Washington County Historical Society

Washington County
Minneapolis–Saint Paul
Minnesota counties on the Mississippi River
1849 establishments in Minnesota Territory
Populated places established in 1849